Pelobium manganitolerans is a Gram-negative, rod-shaped, facultative anaerobic and motile bacterium from the genus of Pelobium which has been isolated from sludge from a manganese mine.

References

External links
Type strain of Pelobium manganitolerans at BacDive -  the Bacterial Diversity Metadatabase

Sphingobacteriia
Bacteria described in 2016